The Rifle Grenade General Service (RGGS) was a rifle grenade of Israeli design in service with the British Army as the L86 since 1996. They superseded the L74A1 and L75A1, these being the Luchaire 40mm in AC and AP/AV configurations respectively.

As with its predecessors, the grenade's means of propulsion is of the bullet-trap type and is launched from the muzzle of the L85A2 rifle using standard ball ammunition. For maximum accuracy a dedicated prismatic sight can be attached to the rifle.

The grenade was phased out of service due to the introduction of the L17A2 Underslung Grenade Launcher.

Notes

External links
Picture of the RGGS
Article (in Spanish) with reference to the Israeli BT/AP-M1091 rifle grenade, with cutaway diagrams of the L74A1 & L75A1

Grenades of the United Kingdom
Rifle grenades
Weapons of Israel